Valleywise Health (formerly Maricopa Integrated Health System) is a network of taxpayer-funded hospitals and medical facilities in Maricopa County, Arizona.

History 
Maricopa Integrated Health System was founded in 1991 in Maricopa County, Arizona. The county's residents approved the formation of a special health care district in 2003. The members of the board of directors are appointed through elections and serve as county public officials.

In October 2018, the organization announced that it would be renamed Valleywise Health effective mid-2019.

Facilities
Facilities include:

 Hospital and emergency care center
 Valleywise Health Medical Center (Phoenix)

 Behavioral centers
 Valleywise Behavioral Health Center – Phoenix
 Valleywise Behavioral Health Center – Maryvale (Phoenix)
 It opened in a former Abrazo Community Health Network hospital facility in 2019. Valleywise paid $60 million to acquire the former Maryvale Hospital.
 Valleywise Behavioral Health Center – Mesa

 Comprehensive health centers
 Valleywise Comprehensive Health Center – Phoenix
 Valleywise Comprehensive Health Center – Peoria
 It had a cost of $70 million. The Valleywise board in 2017 decided to have the facility built.

 Emergency care center (only)
 Valleywise Emergency – Maryvale (Phoenix)

 Community health centers
 Valleywise Community Health Center – McDowell
 Valleywise Community Health Center – North Phoenix
 Valleywise Community Health Center – South Central Phoenix
 Valleywise Community Health Center – South Phoenix/Laveen
 Valleywise Community Health Center – West Maryvale (Phoenix)
 The clinic moved to its current West Maryvale location on October 28, 2021.
 Valleywise Community Health Center – Avondale
 Valleywise Community Health Center – Chandler
 Valleywise Community Health Center – Guadalupe
 Valleywise Community Health Center – Mesa

References

External links
 

Hospitals in Arizona
Maricopa County, Arizona
Public hospitals in the United States
Trauma centers
Hospital networks in the United States